The coat of arms of Buenos Aires is the official shield used by the different areas and dependencies of the Government of the city of Buenos Aires, Argentina.

The current coat of arms was adopted by law number 4408, sanctioned by the Buenos Aires City Legislature in 2012.

History
On October 20, 1580 the government of the city of La Trinidad and the port of Buen Ayre, headed by Juan de Garay, received an insignia sent to it by the crown for their approval.  It depicted an eagle which was unfortunately looking to the left (the right of the observer), which in heraldry suggests "illegitimacy" .  There was another error, in that the crown was royal (which is supposed to be reserved for the highest nobility). Perhaps because of the presumed distaste of heraldry experts, the insignia was not approved until September 20, 1596, and fell out of use quite quickly.

On November 29, 2012, the Buenos Aires City Legislature passed a bill that modified and restored the original format of the insignia. The new symbol is a refined version of the coat of arms approved on July 7, 1856 by the City Council of Buenos Aires which received final approval by Order of December 3, 1923. It is an oval with the image of the Río de la Plata, two ships symbolizing the two foundations of the City, and a white dove with its wings spread over the sky.

Gallery

See also

Coat of arms of Buenos Aires Province

References 

Buenos Aires